"Vamos Amigos" is a song by Swedish singers Mendez and Alvaro Estrella. The song was performed for the first time in Melodifestivalen 2020, where it made it to the final through the Second Chance round. The song ended up in eleventh place, scoring a total of 40 points.

Charts

References

2020 singles
English-language Swedish songs
Melodifestivalen songs of 2020
Songs written by Jimmy Jansson
2020 songs
Spanish-language songs